The 2022 NASCAR Mexico Series was the fifteenth season of the NASCAR Mexico Series, a regional stock car racing series sanctioned by NASCAR in Mexico. It is the eighteenth season of the series as a NASCAR-sanctioned series. It began with the Gran Premio Nus–Kah at Súper Óvalo Chiapas on 10 April and ended with the NASCAR Puebla Gran Final at Autódromo Miguel E. Abed on 11 December.

The series reverted back to the NASCAR Mexico Series name starting this year after PEAK (and parent company Old World Industries) did not continue their title sponsorship and a replacement title sponsor was not found. The last year where the series did not have a title sponsor and had this name was 2015.

Salvador de Alba Jr. entered the season as the defending champion. Rubén García Jr. won his record-breaking fourth championship in the series in 2022.

Schedule, results and standings

Schedule and race results
Source:

Drivers' championship

Source: 

 Rubén García Jr. – 232
 Abraham Calderón – 227
 Ruben Rovelo – 216
 Rogelio López – 213
 Salvador de Alba Jr. – 198
 Enrique Baca – 181
 Jorge Goeters – 178
 Xavi Razo – 177
 Max Gutiérrez – 177
 José Luis Ramírez – 173
 Jake Cosío – 173
 Germán Quirogao – 165
 Omar Jarudo – 147
 Rubén Pardo – 145
 Manuel Gutiérrez – 136

See also
 2022 NASCAR Cup Series
 2022 NASCAR Xfinity Series
 2022 NASCAR Camping World Truck Series
 2022 ARCA Menards Series
 2022 ARCA Menards Series East
 2022 ARCA Menards Series West
 2022 NASCAR Whelen Modified Tour
 2022 NASCAR Pinty's Series
 2022 NASCAR Whelen Euro Series
 2022 SRX Series

References

External links
 
PEAK Mexico Series Standings and Statistics for 2022

NASCAR Mexico Series
NASCAR Mexico Series